The 1924 United States presidential election in Alabama took place on November 4, 1924, as part of the nationwide presidential election, which was held throughout all contemporary forty-eight states. Voters chose twelve representatives, or electors, to the Electoral College, who voted for president and vice president.

Alabama was won easily by John W. Davis of West Virginia over incumbent president Calvin Coolidge and Progressive nominee Robert M. La Follette of Wisconsin. With 67.8% of the popular vote, Alabama was Davis' 6th strongest state.

Results

Results by county

See also
United States presidential elections in Alabama

Notes

References

Alabama
1924
1924 Alabama elections